Transportin-2 is a protein that in humans is encoded by the TNPO2 gene.

Interactions 

TNPO2 has been shown to interact with NXF1, NUP98 and Ran (biology).

References

Further reading